These hits topped the Dutch Top 40 in 1963.

See also
1963 in music

References

1963 in the Netherlands
1963 record charts
1963